Rasna is a village in the municipality of Požega, western Serbia. According to the 2011 census, the village has a population of 995 inhabitants.

Demographics

References

Populated places in Zlatibor District